Bart Evans is a former Major League Baseball pitcher. He was born on December 30, 1970, in Springfield, Missouri. He attended college at Missouri State University and was drafted by the Kansas City Royals in the 9th round of the 1992 MLB draft. Bart pitched 8 career games with and ERA of 2.00.
Bart married and had two children, Abbey(12) and Andrew(16) who also plays Baseball.

External links
Baseball Reference

1970 births
Living people
Baseball players from Missouri
Major League Baseball pitchers
Kansas City Royals players
Missouri State Bears baseball players
Three Rivers Raiders baseball players
Eugene Emeralds players
Omaha Golden Spikes players
Omaha Royals players
Rockford Royals players
Toledo Mud Hens players
Wichita Wranglers players
Wilmington Blue Rocks players